Yian or Yi'an may refer to:

Places in China
Yi'an County (依安縣), a county in Heilongjiang province
Yi'an District (義安區), a district in Anhui province
Yi'an Town, Heilongjiang (依安镇), a town and the county seat of Yi'an County, Heilongjiang
Yi'an, Shijiazhuang (宜安镇), a township-level division of Luquan, Shijiazhuang, Hebei
Yi'an, Laishui County (义安镇), a town in Laishui County, Hebei province
Yi'an, Shanxi (义安镇), a town in Jiexiu, Jinzhong Prefecture, Shanxi province
Yian (乂安), a prefecture in the Chinese province of Jiaozhi in northern Vietnam

People
Fong Kay Yian (born 1996), Singaporean diver
Li Yian, Chinese footballer in the 2004–05 Hong Kong Senior Challenge Shield
Sun Yian, Chinese screenwriter nominated in 1995 for the Golden Rooster Award for Best Writing
Tan Bee Yian, Singaporean bowler at the 2005 Southeast Asian Games
Yian Shi, discoverer of Shi epoxidation in 1996
Yian Yiru (一庵一如), Chinese ambassador during the 1401–1402 Japanese mission to Ming China
Huang Yian, a name for Yuri Huang (born 1986), Chinese artist

Fictional
Yian (fictional city), in "The Maker of Moons", an 1896 short story by Robert Chambers
Yian Yang, main character in the Chinese TV series Beautiful Life

See also
Empress Yi'an (disambiguation)